The 1929 United Kingdom general election was held on Thursday, 30 May 1929 and resulted in a hung parliament. Ramsay MacDonald's Labour Party won the most seats in the House of Commons for the first time. The Liberal Party led again by former Prime Minister David Lloyd George regained some ground lost in the 1924 general election and held the balance of power. Parliament was dissolved on 10 May.

The election was often referred to as the "Flapper Election", because it was the first in which women aged 21–29 had the right to vote (owing to the Representation of the People Act 1928). (Women over 30 had been able to vote since the 1918 general election.)

The election was fought against a background of rising unemployment, with the memory of the 1926 general strike still fresh in voters' minds. By 1929, the Cabinet was being described by many as "old and exhausted".

The Liberals campaigned on a comprehensive programme of public works under the title "We Can Conquer Unemployment". There was anticipation of a potential revival of the Liberal Party after the reunification of Independent Liberals and National Liberals under Lloyd George's leadership in 1928 and following some victories in a series of by-elections after 1926. The incumbent Conservatives campaigned on the theme of "Safety First", with Labour campaigning on the theme of "Labour & the Nation".

This was the first general election to be contested by the newly formed Welsh nationalist party Plaid Cymru.

It stood as the last time when a third party polled more than one-fifth of the popular vote until 1983. The Liberals performed more successfully than at the previous general election in 1924, but could not regain its pre-World War I status as a party of government. The next election thus ushered in five decades in which two-party politics dominated.

Results

|}

Votes summary

Seats summary

Constituency results

Transfers of seats
 All comparisons are with the 1924 election.
In some cases, the change is owing to the MP having defected to the gaining party, and then retaining the seat in 1929. Such circumstances are marked with a *.
In other circumstances, the change is owing to the seat having been won by the gaining party in a by-election in the intervening years, and then retained in 1929. Such circumstances are marked with a †.

1 Previous MP had defected to the Conservatives by the 1929 election
2 Previous MP had defected to the Liberals by the 1929 election

See also
List of MPs elected in the 1929 United Kingdom general election
1929 United Kingdom general election in Northern Ireland
Constituency election results in the 1929 United Kingdom general election

References

Sources

Further reading

External links
United Kingdom election results—summary results 1885–1979

Manifestos
1929 Conservative manifesto
1929 Labour manifesto
1929 Liberal manifesto

 
1929
General election
General election
United Kingdom general election
Ramsay MacDonald
Stanley Baldwin
David Lloyd George